Worcester Magazine is a weekly free alternative media magazine in Worcester, Massachusetts. Established in 1976, the magazine is distributed at more than 400 locations across Central Massachusetts. It is published weekly on Thursdays. Businessman Allen Fletcher is the former publisher of the magazine. In 2008, Holden Landmark Corporation purchased Worcester Magazine. In 2018, Holden Landmark Corporation  was acquired by GateHouse Media, owner of the Telegram & Gazette.

The New England Press Association named it as the publication of the year. In March 2014, the circulation of Worcester Magazine was 27,404 copies.

References

External links
 WorcesterMag.com

1976 establishments in Massachusetts
Alternative magazines
News magazines published in the United States
Weekly magazines published in the United States
Magazines established in 1976
Magazines published in Massachusetts
Mass media in Worcester, Massachusetts